Ben Moran House, is a historical residence in Mason County, Kentucky, which was built in 1818.  The building was listed on the National Register of Historic Places in 1987, as part of a study of early stone houses in Kentucky.

It was in "good" condition in 1984. It's roof was replaced by a higher one in the 1880s either to make more space or to follow the then-current Gothic Revival fashion. The house had a rear ell which was damaged in a 1981 fire and was removed or replaced.

It was asserted to be "unique for its very primitive off-center fenestration reflecting the plan. It is not as sophisticated as the similarly sized Streube House (BK-23) in neighboring Bracken County. This one and the McGee House (ME-178 N.R.) in Mercer County are the most non-symmetrical of the early stone houses in Kentucky. This house was enlarged by steepening the roof in the Gothic period, either to add space or because of a change in fashion."

See also
John McGee House, Cornishville

References

External links
Flickr photos of the house

National Register of Historic Places in Mason County, Kentucky
Houses completed in 1818
Stone houses in the United States
Houses on the National Register of Historic Places in Kentucky
1818 establishments in Kentucky
Federal architecture in Kentucky
Houses in Mason County, Kentucky